Cooper v. Pate, 378 U.S. 546 (1964), was a U.S. Supreme Court case in which the court ruled for the first time that state prison inmates have the standing to sue in federal court to address their grievances  under the Civil Rights Act of 1871. This case followed Jones v. Cunningham (1963) allowing prison inmates to employ a writ of habeas corpus to challenge the legality of their sentencing and the conditions of their imprisonment.

Background
The petitioner, an inmate at the Illinois State Prison, brought a writ of certiorari alleging that solely because  he was a Black Muslim he was denied permission to buy religious publications and also denied other privileges accorded other prisoners. The District Court had granted the respondent's motion to dismiss for failure to state a claim for which relief could be granted.  The Court of Appeals affirmed.

Opinion of the Court
The Supreme Court reversed the judgment, stating the lower courts were in error to dismiss the stated cause of action as the petitioner is entitled to have his case heard on its merits.

Significance
This case made clear that  prison authorities must do whatever is within their ability to treat individuals of every  religious group equally, unless they can demonstrate good reasons  to do otherwise.

See also
List of United States Supreme Court cases, volume 378

References

Further reading

External links
 
The Religious Justice and Law Religious Liberty Archive

Imprisonment and detention in the United States
Penal system in the United States
United States Eighth Amendment case law
United States Supreme Court cases
United States Supreme Court cases of the Warren Court
1964 in United States case law